The  is a Japanese third-sector railway that connects Hyōgo, Okayama and Tottori prefectures. The Chizu Line is not electrified, but is a high-grade railroad, and extends a total of 56.1 kilometres. The limited expresses Super Hakuto and Super Inaba operate on this line.

Chizu Express Chizu Line 

Some local trains operate through from the JR West Imbi Line (Tottori - Chizu).

History
Construction of the line was approved under the Railway Construction Act in 1922, and commenced by Japanese National Railways (JNR) in June 1966. Work was well advanced when a freeze on expenditure in 1980 resulted in construction being halted with 95% of the route acquired and 93% of the earthworks completed.

The Tottori Prefectural Government facilitated the establishment of the Chizu Express Company in May 1986, which resumed construction.

The line opened on December 3, 1994, and includes the 5,592 m Shitozaka tunnel.

From November 29, 1997, the JR limited express Super Inaba service commenced between Okayama and Tottori.

See also
 List of railway lines in Japan

References

External links

  
  Wiki collection of bibliographic works on Chizu Express

 
1986 establishments in Japan
Companies based in Tottori Prefecture
Japanese third-sector railway lines
Railway companies of Japan